Denise Idris Jones (7 December 1950 – 24 July 2020; née Woodrow) was a Labour member of the National Assembly for Wales for the Conwy Assembly constituency between 2003 and 2007.

She served on the Culture, Welsh Language & Sport Committee; the Education & Lifelong Learning Committee; the Audit Committee and the North Wales Regional Committee. She was a native of Rhosllanerchrugog, near Wrexham and spoke Welsh, English, and French.

History

As a student in Liverpool, she worked for Harold Wilson’s campaign. She taught English and French at Grango Secondary Modern School, Rhosllanerchrugog, for around 30 years. She was a Member of the Assembly for the Constituency of Conwy between May 2003 and 2007.
She lived in Ruthin, where she died on 24 July 2020.

References

Female members of the Senedd
Wales AMs 2003–2007
Welsh Labour politicians
1950 births
2020 deaths
Welsh schoolteachers
21st-century British women politicians